The Face in the Abyss is a fantasy novel by American writer A. Merritt.  It is composed of a novelette with the same title and its sequel, "The Snake Mother".  It was first published in its complete form in 1931 by Horace Liveright.  The novelette "The Face in the Abyss" originally appeared in the magazine Argosy All-Story Weekly in the September 8, 1923 issue.  "The Snake Mother" was originally serialized in seven parts in Argosy beginning with the October 25, 1930 issue.

Plot introduction
The novel concerns American mining engineer Nicholas Graydon.  While searching for lost Inca treasure in South America, he encounters Suarra, handmaiden to the Snake Mother of Yu-Atlanchi.  She leads Graydon to an abyss where Nimir, the Lord of Evil is imprisoned in a face of gold.  While Graydon's companions are transformed by the face into globules of gold on account of their greed, he is saved by Suarra and the Snake Mother whom he joins in their struggle against Nimir.

Reception
Peter Levi has noted parallels between The Face in the Abyss and a story H.P. Lovecraft created as a ghostwriter, "The Mound."

References

Sources

External links
The Face in the Abyss at Project Gutenberg Australia
 

1931 American novels
1931 fantasy novels
American fantasy novels
Novels about dinosaurs
Novels first published in serial form
Works originally published in Argosy (magazine)
Novels set in South America
Lost world novels